Joan Lillian Hawes (18 November 1933 – 6 December 2019) was an English cricketer who played as a right-arm medium bowler. She appeared in three Test matches for England in 1957 and 1958. She played domestic cricket for Surrey.

References

External links
 
 

1933 births
2019 deaths
People from Lambeth
England women Test cricketers
Surrey women cricketers